Sibay is a town in the Republic of Bashkortostan, Russia, located on the border between Europe and Asia, on the east slope of the Southern Urals, in the spurs of Irendyk,  from Ufa, the capital of the republic. Population:

History
Sibay was granted urban-type settlement status in 1938. On November 21, 1955, it was granted town status.

Administrative and municipal status
Within the framework of administrative divisions, it is, together with the territory of Tuyalyassky Selsoviet (which comprises the selo of Tuyalyas), incorporated as the town of republic significance of Sibay—an administrative unit with the status equal to that of the districts. As a municipal division, the town of republic significance of Sibay is incorporated as Sibay Urban Okrug.

Economy

The town is served by the Sibay Airport.

Education
Sibay is home to the following educational facilities:
a branch of Bashkir State University
a branch of Bashkir State Agrarian University
a branch of Ufa Art College
a branch of Ufa College of Radio Electronics
Sibay medical school
Sibay Trade and Economic College
Sibay Teachers College
Sibay Polytechnic College

Demographics
Sibay's ethnic composition, as of the 2010 Census, is as follows:
Bashkirs: 53.0%
Russians: 35.6%
Tatars: 8.3%
other ethnicities: 3.1%

References

Notes

Sources

External links
Official website of Sibay
Unofficial website of Sibay
Mojgorod.ru. Entry on Sibay 

Cities and towns in Bashkortostan
Populated places established in 1938